In Greek mythology, Glaucus  (Ancient Greek: Γλαῦκος Glaukos means "greyish blue" or "bluish green" and "glimmering") was a Cretan prince as the son of King Minos.

Family 
Glaucus' mother was Queen Pasiphaë, daughter of Helios, and thus, brother to Acacallis, Ariadne, Androgeus, Deucalion, Phaedra, Xenodice, and Catreus.

Mythology 
One day, while playing with a ball or chasing a mouse Glaucus fell into a jar of honey and died.

Unable to find their son, his parents went to the Oracle at Delphi who told them "A marvelous creature has been born amongst you: whoever finds the true likeness for this creature will also find the child." They interpreted this to refer to a newborn calf in Minos' herd. Three times a day, the calf changed color from white to red to black. Polyidus (or Asclepius, god of medicine) observed the similarity to the ripening of the fruit of the mulberry (or possibly the blackberry) plant, and Minos sent him to find Glaucus.

Searching for the boy, Polyidus saw an owl driving bees away from a wine-cellar in Minos' palace. Inside the wine-cellar was a cask of honey, with Glaucus dead inside.  Minos demanded Glaucus be brought back to life, though Polyidus objected. Minos was justified in his insistence, as the Delphic Oracle had said that the seer would restore the child alive. Minos shut Polyidus up in the wine-cellar with a sword. When a snake appeared nearby, Polyidus killed it with the sword. Another snake came for the first, and after seeing its mate dead, the second serpent left and brought back a herb which then brought the first snake back to life.  Following this example, Polyidus used the same herb to resurrect Glaucus.

Minos refused to let Polyidus leave Crete until he taught Glaucus the art of divination.  Polyidus did so, but then, at the last second before leaving, he asked Glaucus to spit in his mouth.  Glaucus did so and forgot everything he had been taught. The story of Polyidus and Glaucus was the subject of a lost play attributed to Euripides. Glaucus later led an army that attacked Italy, introducing to them the military girdle and shield. This was the source of his Italian name, Labicus, meaning "girdled".

Glaucus had a daughter called Deiphobe, who was a priestess of Phoebus Apollo and Diana Trivia who features in The Aeneid in Book 6.

See also

Tiresias

Notes

References
Gaius Julius Hyginus, Fabulae from The Myths of Hyginus translated and edited by Mary Grant. University of Kansas Publications in Humanistic Studies. Online version at the Topos Text Project.
Pseudo-Apollodorus, The Library with an English Translation by Sir James George Frazer, F.B.A., F.R.S. in 2 Volumes, Cambridge, MA, Harvard University Press; London, William Heinemann Ltd. 1921. Online version at the Perseus Digital Library. Greek text available from the same website
 Publius Vergilius Maro, Aeneid. Theodore C. Williams. trans. Boston. Houghton Mifflin Co. 1910. Online version at the Perseus Digital Library.
 Publius Vergilius Maro, Bucolics, Aeneid, and Georgics. J. B. Greenough. Boston. Ginn & Co. 1900. Latin text available at the Perseus Digital Library.
Smith, William; Dictionary of Greek and Roman Biography and Mythology, London (1873). "Glaucus" 6.

Princes in Greek mythology
Cretan characters in Greek mythology
LGBT themes in Greek mythology